Alka Vuica (born 8 June 1961) is a Croatian singer, lyricist and TV presenter. Her musical style can be described as a mixture of pop and local folk.

Biography 
Born in Pula to Zvonko and Zdenka Vuica, she started writing songs at a young age. At the age of 18, she moved to Zagreb and met Adi Karaselimović who was a drummer of a band Srebrna Krila. She was introduced to composer Đorđe Novković, manager Vladimir Mihaljek and most importantly Goran Bregović.

In 1980s, she worked as a journalist and as songwriter, especially for Josipa Lisac, for whom she penned "Gdje Dunav ljubi nebo" (Where Danube Kisses the Sky), "Danas sam luda" (Today I'm Crazy), "Kraljica divljine" (Queen of the Wild), "Moja magija" (My Magic) and the album Hoću samo tebe (I Want Only You) which was released in 1983. Throughout the decade she continued to contribute lyrics. In 1990, she contributed to the Yugoslav entry for the Eurovision Song Contest, "Hajde da ludujemo" (Let's Get Crazy), performed by Tajči.

In 1988, she met an artist Vuk Veličković, with whom she had a son called Arian, a producer. In the 1990s, she began performing and releasing her own records. In 1993, she released Laži me (1994), which included "O.K." (featuring Sandi Cenov) that was entered as a contender for the first ever Croatian Eurovision Song Contest entry. She released another three albums that decade with limited success, while criticising the restrictions imposed on Croatian performers to appear in other parts of the former Yugoslavia. In 1999, Vuica made an appearance at the New Year celebrations in Belgrade.

She released a further two albums in 2001 and 2004, before making a return to presenting with the talkshow Jedan na jedan on Nova TV, continuing with performing.

Vuica entered the 2009–10 Croatian presidential election. On 26 October 2009, the Green List announced they were supporting her bid for president. Because of non-sufficient votes, she fell out of race and also noted that 835 votes were stolen from her in Trogir. In 2015, she was called as witness in the Core Media affair involving the newspresenter Dijana Čuljak.

In May 2020, she released the single "Depresija" (Depression).

Her cousin Matija Vuica is a fashion designer.

Discography

Albums
Laži me (1994)
Za tebe čuvam sebe (1995)
Alkatraz (1997)
Balkan Girl (1999)
Profesionalka (2001)
Cirkus (2004)
Alkina kafana (2013)

Compilations

The Best of Alka (1996)
Najljepše ljubavne pjesme (2012)

Filmography

Film

References

External links
http://www.diskografija.com/sastav/alka-vuica.htm

1961 births
Living people
21st-century Croatian women singers
Croatian pop singers
Croatian folk-pop singers
Croatian songwriters
People from Pula
Parovi
20th-century Croatian women singers